William Wilkes Covington (March 19, 1887 – December 10, 1931) was a pitcher in Major League Baseball. He played for the Detroit Tigers. Appearing in 31 games, he posted a 4.10 ERA. He pitched 147 innings between 1911 and 1912. He made no errors in 1911, but three in 1912, greatly affected his career fielding percentage (.929).

His brother Sam also played in the major leagues.

References

External links

Major League Baseball pitchers
Detroit Tigers players
Houston Buffaloes players
Evansville River Rats players
Providence Grays (minor league) players
Kansas City Blues (baseball) players
Mobile Sea Gulls players
Chattanooga Lookouts players
Tulsa Producers players
Denison Railroaders players
San Antonio Bronchos players
Tulsa Oilers (baseball) players
Minor league baseball managers
Baseball players from Tennessee
1887 births
1931 deaths